Marietta Voge, née Mariette Jirku (1918July 1984) was a noted parasitologist, author and educator at the University of California, Berkeley.

Born in an area that became Yugoslavia soon after her birth, Voge received her Ph.D. in 1950 from UC Berkeley. She co-authored a textbook with Edward Markell on the subject of medical parasitology,  in its ninth edition as Markell and Voge's Medical Parasitology. At the time of its first publication in 1958, Voge was an assistant professor at the University of California, Los Angeles School of Medicine. Voge served in 1976 as president of the American Society of Parasitologists.

Voge was married to Noel Voge and was the daughter of Augustina Stridsberg, who worked for Soviet intelligence during World War II. Voge worked for the KGB's San Francisco office according to the Venona project reports.

References

1918 births
1984 deaths
American parasitologists
American people in the Venona papers
American spies for the Soviet Union
Espionage in the United States
University of California, Berkeley alumni
University of California, Los Angeles faculty
Yugoslav emigrants to the United States
Presidents of the American Society of Parasitologists